Chipmunks à Go-Go is an album by Alvin and the Chipmunks and David Seville, released by Liberty Records in 1965, again in 1982, and on compact disc in 1990.

Early pressings of the album incorrectly list the song "Sunshine, Lollipops and Rainbows" as "Sunshine, Lollipops and Roses".

David Seville does not appear on the album, nor are there any incidents between Seville and the three Chipmunks. Chipmunks à Go-Go also marked the only occasion that Ross Bagdasarian did not provide the singing voices of the Chipmunks. Given the variety of musical styles covered, Bagdasarian opted to hire professional studio performers to handle vocal duties.

Track listing

"Sunshine, Lollipops and Rainbows" and "The Race Is On" were deleted for the 1982 re-release.

References

1965 albums
Alvin and the Chipmunks albums
Liberty Records albums
Sunset Records albums
Albums produced by Dave Pell